Valdo Zeqaj (born 24 August 1994 in Vlorë) is an Albanian football player who plays as a defender for Flamurtari Prishtina.

Club career
He joined Besa Kavajë after coming from the KS Flamurtari Vlorë academy.

Honours

References 

1994 births
Living people
Footballers from Vlorë
Albanian footballers
Association football defenders
Flamurtari Vlorë players
Besa Kavajë players
KS Sopoti Librazhd players
KF Apolonia Fier players
Luftëtari Gjirokastër players
KF Flamurtari players
KF Vllaznia Shkodër players
Kategoria Superiore players
Kategoria e Parë players
Football Superleague of Kosovo players
Albanian expatriate footballers
Expatriate footballers in Kosovo
Albanian expatriate sportspeople in Kosovo